The Epic Archive, Vol. 2 (1980–1983) is a compilation album by American rock band Cheap Trick, which was released digitally by Epic in 2015. In 2018, the compilation was released by Real Gone Music on CD and limited edition vinyl.

The compilation has sixteen tracks spanning from 1980 to 1983, including songs from the Found All the Parts EP (1980), soundtrack songs, demos, single versions and live recordings. The liner notes of the 2018 Real Gone Music release include quotes on the tracks from drummer Bun E. Carlos, guitarist Rick Nielsen and bassist Tom Petersson, as well as photographs of the band taken by Robert Alford.

Critical reception

Mark Deming of AllMusic felt the compilation's material was not as "impressive" as The Epic Archive, Vol. 1 (1975–1979) but added, "even at their weakest, Cheap Trick were better than the average arena rock act of the day, and The Epic Archive, Vol. 2 (1980-1983) bears this out." He concluded, "[It's] clearly meant for dedicated fans rather than folks looking for a 'greatest-hits' collection, though there are enough genuine rarities that hardcore Cheap Trick obsessives will be pleased with the thoroughness of the set."

Track listing

Charts

References

Cheap Trick compilation albums
2015 compilation albums
Epic Records compilation albums